Ymer can mean:

 Ymer (dairy product), a Danish soured milk product
 Ymer (1976 icebreaker), a Swedish icebreaker
 Ymer, the first modern housing cooperative in Uppsala, Sweden
 Ymer (journal), a Swedish yearbook on geography published since 1881
 Ymer Island, East Greenland

People

Given name
Ymer Dishnica (1912−1998), Albanian politician and physician
Ymer Pampuri (1944–2017), Albanian weightlifter 
Ymer Prizreni (c. 1820−1887), Albanian politician and diplomat  
Ymer Shaba (born 1998), Albanian footballer 
Ymer Xhaferi (born 1985), Kosovar footballer

Surname
Mikael Ymer (born 1998), Ethiopian tennis player representing Sweden.
Elias Ymer (born 1996), Ethiopian tennis player representing Sweden.

See also:
 Ymir

Albanian masculine given names